Gonggar County, also Gongkar, is a county of Shannan in the Tibet Autonomous Region, one of the 12 counties of the prefecture. It has under its jurisdiction five towns, three townships, 43 administrative villages (neighbourhood committees) and 168 village development committees and contains notable landmarks such as the Gonggar Choide Monastery, the Zhug Dêqên Qoikor Monastery, Gangdoi Town, the Gonggar Dzong at Xoi, the Lhasa Gonggar Airport at Gyazhugling, the Tubdain Ramai Monastery and the county seat of Gyixung.

Legend
The fable narrated about this county is that the "first Tibetan was born to the fairy girl, Ruosa and her monkey lover".

History
History of the county came into limelight with the establishment of the Sakyapa school of Tibetan Buddhism. Among the many dzongs and monasteries established in the 14th century the best known are the Gonngar Dzong and the Gonggar Choede Monastery.

In recent history of the county, during the Cultural Revolution of the 1950s, Gonggar County was the scene of armed rebellion between the Kamba rebels (under the banner of “four rivers and six mountain ranges”) and the Peoples Liberation Army of China (PLA); PLA troops were killed and their convoy of army vehicles ambushed here.

Geography

The Yarlung Tsangpo River (Brahmaputra River), the mother river of Tibet, flows through the Gonggar County and among other counties of Shannan, and is thus rich in water resources. The Gonggar County is situated at a location where Yarlung Tsangpo River is very wide. It is for this reason that the Gonggar Airport was constructed at this location. The county is bounded by the Mount Chuwaru (held sacred in Tibet) opposite to Chusul, the Gompa La Pass to the south on the route to the sacred Yamdrok Lake in West Tibet, on the east to the limits of the Dal Valley on the south bank of the Brahmaputra and Dorje Monastery on the north bank. The county also envelops the southern side valleys of Namrab and Drib counties and the northern side valleys of Leuchung and Trango counties.

Climate
The county has monsoon climate. It has four climatic seasons. It has a long winter and hardly any summer season. The annual sunshine hours are 3,194 and frost-free period is 142 days. It is subject to natural disasters from  frequent storms with 40 days of gale days on an average concentrated in February–April. Solar radiation has been recorded as 7,710 MJ/m2

Vegetation
The forest area in the county is 7.8 million mu and of grassland area is 282 mu. The main crops and vegetables grown are barley, winter wheat, spring wheat, pea, broad bean, rape, radish, potato, Yuan cabbage, tomatoes and cauliflower. Medicinal plants and products in the county are creeping cypress, opulus, ginseng fruits, snow lotus, Chinese caterpillar fungus, Fritillaria, musk and seabuckthorn.

Fauna
The wildlife species recorded in the county are wild yak, wild ass, Tibetan antelope, Tibetan gazelle, and  black-necked cranes. The livestock are mainly yak, pianniu, cattle, goats, sheep, horses, donkeys, mules and pigs.

Economy
The county has predominantly an agricultural economy and is considered the grain base of Shannan. Tourism also adds to the economic development of the county.

Economic progress is witnessed in the county in all sectors of economy. In recent years, the county has held five Trade fairs and 3 cultural fairs to promote local products and Tibetan handicrafts.

Energy
The energy resources of the county consist of the two functioning hydropower stations with generating capacity of 530 MWh. The Yamzhog pumped storage power station with installed capacity of 90 MW is under construction.

Handicrafts
The famous apron, which the Tibetan married women wear, is a handicraft of the Gonggar County in the Jiedexiu area and is known as "Jed Show Apron". The county is synonymous with this apron, which has a distinctive and characteristic style and it is produced here for the last 500 or 600 years.

Demographics

Landmarks
As the cradle of ancient culture and its enviable position in the rich history of Tibet, Gonggar County has unique and rich historical monuments, natural geological features such as lake and caves, scenic regions and religiously linked mountains.

Dorje Drak / Dorjezha monastery

Dorjezha Monastery, situated on a hilltop, blends well with the rock setting and is named after the rock known as Vraja, the green coloured gemstones found behind the monastery. The literal meaning of ‘Dorjezha’ is “Diamond Hill.” It was initially built on modest lines, on the right bank of the Yarlung River by a wealthy local man known as Doxie Dorje. The monastery was destroyed completely in 1717 during Zungar invasion of this area. It was, however, rebuilt in 1718. Further, the monastery was supported by the Fifth Dalai Lama and consequently, it underwent major improvements and became one of the famous monasteries of Tibet. At the peak of its popularity 2000 monks of Nyingma sect resided here; it is known as the only ancestral monastery of the Sakyapa sect. It was substantially damaged during the Cultural Revolution. However, it was rebuilt in 1978. At present, 29 monks reside here, and most of them are from the Gonggar County, except one monk who is from Renbo County of Shigatse Prefecture. The Management system established is democratic, with each individual member of the Management Commission made responsible for particular tasks such as religious activities, finance and daily matters. It maintains close interaction with the Choqin Monastery (Dege County in Sichuan province) also of the Nyigma sect and both follow the same teaching and practicing of Buddhist tenets. In this monastery, the practice of the “Reincarnation of the Living Buddha” is followed and hence it has the name of Renchenqinmo Dorjeza Jambeilobsam Gyinmeinamzogyacho and the present Living Buddha is the 10th Reincarnation in this lineage, and as result this monastery has huge reputation among the adherents of Tibetan Buddhism.

Mao Zedong statue
A large statue of Mao Zedong has been installed in the Gonggar County in Gonggar town. The statue was erected by contributions made by the people of Hunan Province, where Mao was born. The statue, erected in honour of the Chairman Mao, was in gratitude for the people of his hometown. It cost 480,000 yuan (US$60,000).

Gyaideshiu town
Gyaideshiu town (also spelt Jiedexiu Town) is famous for the Gyaideshiu 'Bangdian' apron not only among women in Tibet but also is in demand in Nepal, India, Bhutan and Western Europe. The town is located in the county,  to its east on the highway towards Zetang. Bangdian" is an apron of China's Tibetan ethnic group with historic heritage of 1,500 years of hand weaving. This weaving technique is designated as "China's state-level intangible cultural heritage."

Transport
There are two National Highways passing through the county, apart from several rural network of roads. The county is also famous for the Lhasa Gonggar Airport.

References

External links
Hudong Encyclopedia 

 
Counties of Tibet
Shannan, Tibet